State Route 258 is a highway within Sevier County in central Utah connecting Interstate 70 to SR-118 and serving as the community of Elsinore's Main Street. It is two miles (3 km) long.

Route description
From its western terminus at a cattle guard just west of the junction with Interstate 70, the highway maintains the same easterly direction through Elsinore. It then veers to the northeast before terminating at SR-118.

History
The state legislature created State Route 258 in 1957, forming a loop east of SR-11 (US-89, now SR-118 and SR-258), along its former alignment through Central (between Elsinore and Richfield). When SR-11 was truncated to SR-4 (future I-70) at Sevier Junction in 1969, former SR-258 was removed from the state highway system, but the number was reused in the same area for what was SR-11 until 1969. At the time, its termini were proposed SR-4 in Elsinore and SR-120 near 600 South in Richfield; the north end was truncated slightly in 1987, when SR-120 was built along 1200 South, and further in 1992, when the majority became an extension of SR-118. However, none of these changes affected signage, as US-89 remained on the old road through Elsinore and Richfield until 1992, after I-70 was finally completed in the area.

Major intersections

References

258
 258
Streets in Utah